Karno may refer to:

Plants 
 Platysace maxwellii

People

Surname 
 Fred Karno (1866–1941), British theatre impresario
 Norton S. Karno (born 1936), American attorney
 Rano Karno (born 1960), Indonesian actor and politician
 Rendra Karno (1920–1985), Indonesian actor
 Bung Karno, nickname of Sukarno (1901–1970), first President of Indonesia

Given name 
 Karno Barkah (1922–2009), Indonesian aviation pioneer

Fictional characters 
 Madelein Karno, a character from books written by Lene Kaaberbøl